The 2011 Ladbrokes.com World Darts Championship was the 18th World Championship organised by the Professional Darts Corporation since it separated from the British Darts Organisation. The event took place at the Alexandra Palace, London from 16 December 2010 and 3 January 2011. A total of 72 players took part, 16 of whom began at the preliminary round stage, with the eight winners joining the remaining 56 players in the first round proper.

Phil Taylor was the defending champion, having won the 2010 tournament. He was knocked out of the tournament at the quarter final stage by Mark Webster, who in turn was defeated by Adrian Lewis in the semi-finals. Lewis went on to win the tournament, beating Gary Anderson 7–5 in the final to become only the fifth different PDC World Champion and the first to have won it without having won the rival BDO World Championship.

The final between Adrian Lewis and Gary Anderson was notable for being the last match that Sid Waddell commentated on at the PDC World Darts Championship before his passing in 2012. It was also notable for the first ever nine-dart finish in a world championship final, hit by Lewis in the third leg of the match.

4-time PDC World Championship semi-finalist Wayne Mardle was a notable absentee, missing out on his first World Championship since  1999. The 3-time PDC World Championship finalist Peter Manley was also another notable absentee, having missed out since 1998.

Format and qualifiers
The televised stages featured 72 players from a minimum of 22 countries. The top 32 players in the PDC Order of Merit on 29 November 2010 were seeded for the tournament. They were joined by the 16 highest non qualified players in the Players Championship Order of Merit from events played on the PDC Pro Tour.

These 48 players were joined by two PDPA qualifiers (which were determined at a PDPA Qualifying event held in Derby on November 29, 2010), and 22 international players: the 4 highest names in the European Order of Merit not already qualified, the 2 highest names in the North American Order of Merit not already qualified and 16 further international qualifiers determined by the PDC and PDPA.

Some of the international players, such as the 4 from the European Order of Merit, and the top American and Australian players were entered straight into the first round, while others, having won qualifying events in their countries, were entered into the preliminary round.

Order of Merit

Pro Tour
  Steve Farmer
  Richie Burnett
  Steve Brown
  Justin Pipe
  Tony Eccles
  Dennis Smith
  Nigel Heydon
  Brendan Dolan
  Steve Hine
  Steve Maish
  Kevin McDine
  Mark Hylton
  Chris Thompson
  Peter Wright
  Steve Evans
  Joe Cullen
  Kirk Shepherd

European Order of MeritFirst Round Qualifiers
  Antonio Alcinas
  Andree Welge
  Bernd Roith
  Mensur Suljović

PDPA QualifiersFirst Round Qualifier
  Alex Roy
Preliminary Round Qualifier
  Matt Padgett

International QualifiersFirst Round Qualifiers
  Darin Young
  Shane Tichowitsch
  Rob Modra

Preliminary Round Qualifiers
  Gary Mawson
  Jyhan Artut
  Dietmar Burger
  Magnus Caris
  Juanito Gionson
  Morihiro Hashimoto
  Boris Krčmar
  Per Laursen
  Scott MacKenzie
  Norman Madhoo
  Mickey Mansell
  Devon Petersen
  Preston Ridd
  Roland Scholten
  Veijo Viinikka

1 Rob Modra was unable to get a visa, so therefore, he was replaced by Kirk Shepherd, the next highest ranked player in the Players Championship Order of Merit.

Prize money
The 2011 World Championship featured a prize fund of £1,000,000 – the same as in the previous year.  The Third Place Playoff did not take place this year.

The prize money is allocated as follows:

Schedule

Preliminary round
The preliminary round was played from Dec 16 to Dec 23 with one match per day. The format was best of 7 legs.

Last 64
The winner of the eight Preliminary Round matches joined 56 other players in the First Round.

The First Round draw took place on Tuesday 30 November live in the studio of Sky Sports News, and was conducted by 1983 World champion Keith Deller and Sky Sports darts' analyst and former World Matchplay champion, Rod Harrington.

Final

Statistics

Representation from different countries
This table shows the number of players by country in the World Championship, the total number including the preliminary round.

Television coverage
Sky Sports broadcast all 72 matches live in high-definition in the United Kingdom. Dave Clark presented the coverage with analysis from Rod Harrington and Eric Bristow. They also commentated on matches along with Sid Waddell (in his final PDC World Darts Championship commentating appearance), John Gwynne, Nigel Pearson, Rod Studd and Stuart Pyke. This was the first PDC World Championship where Dave Lanning wasn't commentating having retired prior to the tournament. Due to the ill health of Harrington, Wayne Mardle replaced him post-Christmas and featured both commentating and co-presenting alongside Clark. Former England cricketer Andrew Flintoff was also a guest commentator twice during tournament. Interviews were handled by either Clark, Bristow or Studd.

In the Netherlands SBS6 broadcast all matches live through a live stream on the SBS6 website and Sport1 broadcast all the matches on television, both with commentary provided by Jacques Nieuwlaat and Leo Oldenburger. In Germany it was broadcast live on Sport1 with co-commentary provided by Roland Scholten, and in Australia it was broadcast live on Fox Sports.

References

External links
 The official site of the Ladbrokes.com PDC World Darts Championship
 2011 World Championship NetZone; Results and Schedule
 2011 PDC World Darts Championship at Sky Sports

2011
2010 in darts
2011 in darts
PDC World Darts Championship
PDC World Darts Championship
2011 in British sport
December 2010 sports events in the United Kingdom
International sports competitions in London
Alexandra Palace
January 2011 events in the United Kingdom